The New Adventures were a Dutch blues rock band successful during the 1980s. The basic line up consisted of Peter Bootsman lead guitar and vocals, Harry de Winter on bass and Bennie Top on drums.

Discography
Albums:
New Adventures 	1980 	14 on Dutch chart	
Wild Cats Moanin' 	1981 	17 on Dutch chart 	
Point Blank 	1982 	20 on Dutch chart 	
Radiator 	1983 				
The Best Adventures 	1983 compilation
Live's A Mess 	1986 	Live album
Babyshake 	1998 	 
Station Zero 	2014

References

Dutch musical groups